Stephan Barea (born May 22, 1991) is a soccer player who plays for Greek American AA, as a midfielder.

Born in the United States, he represented Puerto Rico at international level.

Career
Barea played college soccer for Hofstra Pride, as well as senior soccer for Long Island Rough Riders and Greek American AA.

He earned one international cap for Puerto Rico in 2011.

References

1991 births
Living people
Soccer players from New York (state)
American soccer players
Puerto Rican footballers
Puerto Rico international footballers
Hofstra Pride men's soccer players
Long Island Rough Riders players
Greek American AA players
USL League Two players
Association football midfielders
People from Levittown, New York
Sportspeople from Nassau County, New York